The Awakening of Woman is a 1927 German silent comedy film directed by Fred Sauer and starring Grete Mosheim, Hilde Maroff, and Hermann Vallentin.

The film's sets were designed by the art director Kurt Richter.

Cast

References

Bibliography

External links

1927 films
1927 comedy films
German comedy films
Films of the Weimar Republic
German silent feature films
Films directed by Fred Sauer
German black-and-white films
Silent comedy films
1920s German films
1920s German-language films